Esmeraldas Formation may refer to:
 Esmeraldas Formation, Colombia, an Eocene geologic formation in Colombia
 Esmeraldas Formation, Ecuador, an Early Pliocene geologic formation in Ecuador